Emmanuel Osei Okoduwa (born 21 November 1983) is a Nigerian former professional football striker. He is better known in the Eastern Europe after becoming a top scorer in the Ukrainian Premier League. From 2001 through 2007 Okoduwa played over 100 games in the Ukrainian top division, mainly Arsenal Kyiv.

Overview
The former First Bank forward had previously been a big hit at Arsenal Kyiv, where he scored 32 goals in 100 top division matches between 2002 and 2006. He also had a spell at K.F.C. Germinal Beerschot.

International
His only international cap Okoduwa earned in the late 2006 during the 2008 African Cup of Nation qualification either against Niger or Lesotho. At that match he came on as a substitution. At that time Okoduwa was a player of Shakhtar Donetsk.

Honours
Arsenal Kyiv
African Games: 2003 Runner-up
Ukrainian Premier League top scorer: 2006, 15 goals (joint title)

References

External links
 Profile at Russian Premier League
 
 
 

1983 births
Living people
Nigerian footballers
Nigerian expatriate footballers
Association football forwards
First Bank F.C. players
FC Shakhtar Donetsk players
FC Metalurh Donetsk players
FC Kuban Krasnodar players
Beerschot A.C. players
FC Dynamo Kyiv players
FC Vorskla Poltava players
FC Arsenal Kyiv players
FC CSKA Kyiv players
AEK Larnaca FC players
Enosis Neon Paralimni FC players
Expatriate footballers in Ukraine
Expatriate footballers in Belgium
Expatriate footballers in Russia
Expatriate footballers in Cyprus
Ukrainian Premier League players
Ukrainian First League players
Russian Premier League players
Belgian Pro League players
Ukrainian Premier League top scorers
Cypriot First Division players
Nigerian expatriate sportspeople in Ukraine
Nigerian expatriate sportspeople in Belgium
Nigerian expatriate sportspeople in Russia
Nigerian expatriate sportspeople in Cyprus
Nigeria international footballers